The 1922 U.S. National Championships (now known as the US Open) was a tennis tournament that took place on the outdoor grass courts at the Germantown Cricket Club in Philadelphia, United States. The women's tournament was held from 14 August until 19 August while the men's tournament ran from 8 September until 16 September. It was the 42nd staging of the U.S. National Championships and the second Grand Slam tennis event of the year.

Finals

Men's singles

 Bill Tilden defeated  Bill Johnston  4–6, 3–6, 6–2, 6–3, 6–4

Women's singles

 Molla Mallory defeated  Helen Wills  6–3, 6–1

Men's doubles
 Bill Tilden /  Vincent Richards defeated  Gerald Patterson /  Pat O'Hara Wood 4–6, 6–1, 6–3, 6–4

Women's doubles
 Marion Zinderstein /  Helen Wills defeated  Edith Sigourney /  Molla Mallory 6–4, 7–9, 6–3

Mixed doubles
 Molla Mallory /  Bill Tilden defeated  Helen Wills /  Howard Kinsey 6–4, 6–3

References

External links
Official US Open website

 
U.S. National Championships
U.S. National Championships (tennis) by year
1922 in sports in Pennsylvania
1922 in American tennis
August 1922 sports events
September 1922 sports events
Sports competitions in Pennsylvania